Lenel  may refer to:

People 
 Otto Lenel (1849–1935), German Jewish jurist and legal historian
 Ludwig Lenel (1914–2002), organist and composer
 Richard Lenel (1869–1950), chairman of the chamber of commerce and honorary citizen of the city of Mannheim, Germany
 Victor Lenel (1838-1917), German-Jewish businessman